Somerset Island may refer to:

 Somerset Island, Bermuda
 Somerset Island (Nunavut), Canada